Wilhelmi may refer to:

People

Surname 
 Arthur Wilhelmi (born 1968), American politician
 Carl Wilhelmi (1829–1884), Dresden born seedsman
 Erin Wilhelmi, American actress
 Roman Wilhelmi (1936–1991), Polish actor

Given name 
 Wilhelmi Malmivaara (1854–1922), clergyman

Other uses 
 Wilhelmi Formation, a geologic formation in Illinois